The Northern Liang (397–439) was a dynastic state of the Sixteen Kingdoms in China. It was ruled by the Juqu family of Lushuihu origin (a branch of the Xiongnu). Although Duan Ye of Han ethnicity was initially enthroned as the Northern Liang ruler with support from the Juqu clan, Duan was subsequently overthrown in 401 and Juqu Mengxun was proclaimed monarch.

All rulers of the Northern Liang proclaimed themselves "wang" (translatable as either "prince" or "king").

History
Most Chinese historians view the Northern Liang as having ended in 439, when its capital Guzang (姑臧) in modern Wuwei, Gansu fell to Northern Wei forces and the Northern Liang ruler Juqu Mujian captured. However, some view his brothers Juqu Wuhui and Juqu Anzhou, who subsequently settled with Northern Liang remnants in Gaochang (高昌) in modern Turpan Prefecture, Xinjiang, as a continuation of the Northern Liang, and thus view the Northern Liang as having ended in 460 when Gaochang fell to Rouran and was made a vassal.

It was during the Northern Liang that the first Buddhist cave shrine sites appear in Gansu Province. The two most famous cave sites are Tiantishan ("Celestial Ladder Mountain"), which was south of the Northern Liang capital at Yongcheng, and Wenshushan ("Manjusri's Mountain"), halfway between Yongcheng and Dunhuang. It had the additional advantage of located not too distant from a main route that also ran N-S to Chengdu and the Indian subcontinent. The Northern Liang also built and decorated the first decorated Mogao Caves (caves 268, 272 and 275) from 419 to 439 CE until the Northern Wei invasion.

In 442, remnants of the Northern Liang royal family established a new kingdom in Gaochang, known in historiography as the Northern Liang of Gaochang (442–460). The new state was led by Juqu Wuhui and Juqu Anzhou where they would hold on to power until 460 when they were conquered by the Rouran.   The remnants of the Juqu family were slaughtered.

Art
The earliest decorated Mogao Caves, caves 268, 272 and 275, were built and decorated by the Northern Liang between 419 and 439 CE, before the invasion of the Northern Wei. They have many common points and were built at the same time as Cave 17 of the Kizil Caves.

Rulers of the Northern Liang

Rulers family tree

See also

Prince of Hexi
Xiongnu
Ethnic groups in Chinese history
Five Barbarians
Sixteen Kingdoms
Gansu
Gaochang

References 

 
Dynasties in Chinese history
Former countries in Chinese history
397 establishments
4th-century establishments in China
5th-century disestablishments in China
460 disestablishments